Benjamin Raphael Teitelbaum (born January 27, 1983) is an American ethnographer and political commentator. An associate professor of ethnomusicology at the University of Colorado, Boulder and former Head of Nordic Studies at the same institution. He is best known for his ethnographic research into far-right groups in Scandinavia and commentary on immigration, and is frequently cited as an expert in Scandinavian and American media.

Books
Teitelbaum is the author of Lions of the North: Sounds of the New Nordic Radical Nationalism (2017), an ethnographic study of radical nationalists in Scandinavia, as well as War for Eternity: The Return of Traditionalism and the Rise of the Populist Right (2020), which explores the role of the Traditionalism in the thinking of figures like Steve Bannon, Olavo de Carvalho, and Aleksandr Dugin.

References

1983 births
Living people
University of Colorado Boulder faculty
American ethnographers
20th-century American Jews
Academics and writers on far-right extremism
21st-century American Jews